Momčilo Gavrić (1 May 1906 – 28 April 1993) was the youngest Serbian soldier, he became a soldier at the age of eight.

Biography 

He was born on May 1, 1906 in Trbušnica, near Loznica, on the slopes of the mountain Gučevo, as the eighth child of eleven, in the family of Alimpije and Jelena Gavrić.

World War I 

In the beginning of August 1914, Austro-Hungarian soldiers of 42nd Croatian Home Guard Infantry Division maimed and hanged his father, mother, grandmother, his three sisters, and four of his brothers. His house was also set on fire. Momčilo survived because he was not at home when it happened — his father had sent him to his uncle earlier.

Left without family and without a home, Momčilo went to find the 6th Artillery Division of the Royal Serbian Army, which was near Gučevo at the time. Major Stevan Tucović, brother of Dimitrije Tucović, accepted Gavrić into his unit after hearing about what had happened, and assigned Miloš Mišović, a soldier in the unit, to be Gavrić's caretaker. The same evening, he took revenge by showing his unit the location of the Austro-Hungarian soldiers, and participated in the bombardment, as told by his son Branislav Gavrić in an interview.

At the age of 8, after the Battle of Cer, he was promoted to the rank of Corporal by the commander of his unit, and given a military uniform.

When his unit was sent to Thessaloniki, Major Tucović sent him to Sorovits where he hastily went through the equivalent of four grades of elementary education.

In Kajmakčalan, Field Marshal Mišić was stunned when he saw a uniformed ten-year-old boy in the trenches. Major Tucović explained the situation to him; that Gavrić had been with them since the Battle of Cer, and that he had both been taught discipline and been wounded during his time in the unit. Mišić promoted Gavrić to Lance Sergeant, and the order was read out to the whole division.

Post-war life 

After the liberation of Belgrade, false 
Major Tucović made sure that Gavrić would receive aid from a British mission that was helping war orphans in Serbia. He was sent to the United Kingdom in Faversham, Kent, and finished his education at the Henry Wreight School (now merged into Queen Elizabeth's Grammar School, Faversham), graduating in 1921. He returned to Serbia the same year, after Serbian Prime Minister Nikola Pašić ordered the return of all children to Serbia. In Trbušnica, he was reunited with his three brothers who had survived the murders in 1914.

According to his son Branislav, Momčilo Gavrić had an incident with the law in 1929. He was working in Šabac and Belgrade when he reached the age of conscription, and at the military barracks in Slavonska Požega, he reported that he already had been in the army during the war. He also said that he had been wounded, and had received the Albanian Commemorative Medal. However, an ethnic Croat in the Royal Yugoslav Army tried to push Gavrić into signing a confession that he had told a lie. He refused, and was sent to prison, spending two months there.

After another period of military service, he returned to Belgrade, where he learnt graphic design and took his driver's licence. There, he also married his wife Kosara, with whom he worked in the Vapa paper mill.

Branislav Gavrić further told that during the Second World War, Momčilo was imprisoned twice by the German occupying forces. After the war, in 1947, OZNA arrested him for claiming that the Albanians were no brothers to Serbs and saying how he "felt that brotherhood of theirs in 1915, when they were killing us", during a time when the presidents of Yugoslavia and Albania (Josip Broz Tito and Enver Hoxha) were great friends.

In 1987, he participated in a Yugoslav documentary about his experiences during the First World War.

Legacy 

Momčilo Gavrić died in Belgrade in 1993. There are memorials dedicated to him on the island of Korfu and in the Jadar Museum in Loznica. In 2014, a street in Loznica was named after him.

On 2 April 2015, the Serbian government decided to raise a monument in Belgrade dedicated to Gavrić.

Further reading

 Sin drinske divizije by Dragiša Penjin, 1986. 
 Sa Gučeva u legendu by Milisav Sekulić, 2009. 
 Momčilo Gavrić - najmlađi kaplar na svetu by Branislav Goldner, 2013.  
 Sudbina najmlađeg kaplara by Svetlana Milovanović, 2014.

Gallery

See also 
 Serbian Campaign (World War I)
 Dragoljub Jeličić (1902–1963), Serbian soldier
 Boško Buha (1926–1943), Yugoslav soldier
 Spomenko Gostić (1978–1993), Bosnian Serb soldier
 Military use of children

References

External links

 
 

1906 births
1993 deaths
20th-century Serbian people
Child soldiers in World War I
People from Loznica
Serbian military personnel of World War I
Serbian soldiers
People educated at Queen Elizabeth's Grammar School, Faversham
Royal Serbian Army soldiers